Henry Lanchester may refer to:

 Henry Jones Lanchester (1834–1914), English architect and surveyor
 Henry Vaughan Lanchester (1863–1953), British architect